John Harris Brady "Bud" Hedinger III (born January 23, 1947) is an American talk radio host in the Orlando, Florida area on station WFLA AM 540 (WFLF).

Biography
Born in Glen Rock, New Jersey, his mother nicknamed him "Bud" the day he was born.

A graduate of Glen Rock High School, he received a bachelor's degree from Colgate University and a master's degree from Syracuse University. During his time at Colgate Hedinger was a member and assistant leader of the Colgate Thirteen, America's most widely heard and second oldest collegiate a cappella group.

From 1969 until 1986, Hedinger was a WSYR television news weatherman, news anchor, and Bowling for Dollars host in Syracuse, New York. He worked at WFTV Channel 9, the ABC television affiliate in Orlando from 1986 until 1989. Hedinger then spent time as an anchor for WTVF NewsChannel 5, the CBS affiliate in Nashville, before returning to Orlando in 1993. He then worked as an anchor at the Orlando affiliate of The CW television network, WKCF Channel 18, for the 10 o'clock news prior to moving on to his current position in radio for iHeartMedia's WFLA 102.5FM and WFLA 540AM Orlando simulcast.

Hedinger liked to give credit to the Bush administration by saying there have been x number of days since a terrorist attack in the United States. He often opens his shows with an announcer saying, "It's all right, have another Bud," in reference to his name.

References

Citations

External links
 Bud Hedinger Live Podcasts on WFLA-FM 540 website

American talk radio hosts
Bowling broadcasters
Colgate University alumni
Glen Rock High School alumni
Radio personalities from Orlando, Florida
Television anchors from Orlando, Florida
People from Glen Rock, New Jersey
Syracuse University alumni
Weather presenters
1947 births
Living people